The Amish are an Anabaptist Christian denomination and its offshoots.

Amish may also refer to:

 Amish, Iowa, United States
 Amish Tripathi, Indian author
 The Amish (film), a 2012 documentary film